Ella Weed (born 27 January 1853 in Newburgh NY - died 10 January 1894 in New York NY) was an American educator, "the guiding spirit in the first four years" of Barnard College.

Life
After graduating from Vassar College, Ella Weed became principal of Miss Brown's School for Girls in New York. Annie Nathan Meyer interested her in the effort to establish Barnard College. Weed attracted financial support for the venture, and became the paid chairman of the Academic Committee.

Works
A Foolish Virgin: a novel, 1883. A satirical novel about a Vassar graduate who tries to hide her intelligence and education.
 Pearls Strung by Ella Weed, 1898. A posthumously-published anthology of selections from Weed's favorite authors.

References

1853 births
1894 deaths
American educators
Vassar College alumni
Presidents of Barnard College